Midwives: A Novel is a novel by Chris Bohjalian, and was chosen as an Oprah's Book Club selection in October 1998.

Plot summary
On an icy winter night in an isolated house in rural Vermont, a seasoned midwife named Sibyl Danforth takes desperate measures to save a baby's life. She performs an emergency cesarean section on a mother she believes has died of a stroke. But what if Sibyl's patient wasn't dead—and Sibyl inadvertently killed her?
Midwives tells the story of Sibyl Danforth from the point of view of her young daughter.

Film, TV or theatrical adaptations
A TV film, Midwives, was made in 2001, adapted from this novel. It stars Sissy Spacek, Piper Laurie and directed by Glenn Jordan.

References

1997 American novels
Novels set in Vermont